The 1978–79 season was the 55th season in the existence of AEK Athens F.C. and the 20th consecutive season in the top flight of Greek football. They competed in the Alpha Ethniki, the Greek Cup and the European Cup. The season began on 3 September 1978 and finished on 16 June 1979.

Overview

The peculiarities of the 1978–79 season could well mark it as historic for the Greek Football, while it was also the last semi-professional season as with the enactment of law 879/79 in March, all the football clubs were obliged to be converted into S.A. to participate in the first professional championship of the next season. In the summer, there was an "epidemic" of transfers by iconic players among the big teams. AEK were the only club that was left in tact. Georgios Delikaris moved from Olympiacos to Panathinaikos, Antonis Antoniadis followed the opposite path and Mimis Domazos left Panathinaikos for AEK. Thus, for one season, AEK had in their roster at the same time the two best Greek football players of the century, both born in 1942, both named "Mimis": Papaioannou and Domazos. The addition of the "general" Mimis Domazos to the roster, with his leadership skills and football mind, would give the already impressive team, the element that would make them one of the most spectacular that have ever played in the Greek stadiums. Furthermore, Loukas Barlos terminated the collaboration with the last season's double winner, Zlatko Čajkovski and brought to the club's bench the great Ferenc Puskás, the architect, alongside Domazos, of Panathinaikos' course to the 1971 European Cup Final, hoping that AEK would do a breakthrough at the European stage.

In the championship, AEK started impressively and was ahead in the standings. Olympiacos were the only rival for the title. While AEK were generously scattering goals and spectacle, while in the opposite of the event, there were many official complaints of the opponents of Olympiacos for attempts of bribery. In the 12th matchday, Oikonomou of Apollon Athens and on the 23rd and the goalkeeper of PAS Giannina, Lisa, reported of bribery on the side of Olympiacos and on the 32nd matchday, after their match against Olympiacos, Rodos punished Doxakis, Papaoikonomou and Skartados for having reduced performance in the match as Olympiacos turned their 3–1 lead in 23 minutes, with the help of the referee as well. AEK also started their obligations in the European Cup against Porto. The quality of the opponent and the fullness of AEK foreshadowed two ambiguous matches with an uncertain outcome. In Nea Filadelfeia, AEK and their fans experienced a magical European night and witnessed the club's biggest victory in the European Cup with 6–1, which gave AEK a largely securing qualification to the next round. In the rematch AEK opened the score in the first half and in the last half hour of the match they turned off the engines as the Portuguese grabbed the opportunity and scored four goals. Next opponent for AEK, Brian Clough's Nottingham Forest. The "Reds" having learned not to underestimate their opponents and seeing AEK's impressive performance against Porto, came to Nea Filadelfeia for the first leg, completely focused on their goal. Nottingham took the lead early on and at the 21st minute, AEK were left with 10 players after the suspension of Milton Viera. At the end of the half Nottingham doubled their lead and until the match was over the Englishmen maintained their strength and AEK managed to reduce to the final 1–2. In the second leg AEK entered the pitch knowing well that a difficult night that awaited them. In the first half, Nottingham easily scored three goals having lost several opportunities to a widen the score, while at the second half, AEK reduced to 3–1 with a header from Bajević. Nottingham completed their imposing appearance with a 5–1 victory and eventually won the trophy. Towards the end of the championship, AEK presented an inexplicable decline in their performance and in the face of the risk of losing the title after the away defeat by Aris on March 11, Barlos decided to remove Puskás from bench of the team and assigned it to his assistant, Andreas Stamatiadis for the rest of the season. In the Greek Cup, it was the first year that the two-legged tie on a home and away basis, for the quarter-finals and the semi-finals were established, according to the model of European cups. The AEK marched through the first three rounds eliminating Kavala, Proodeftiki and Acharnaikos, respectively. In the quarter-final against Anagennisi Epanomi after a 1–1 away draw, AEK won 2–0 in the second leg and qualified to the semi-final where they faced Panachaiki. In Patras, they were defeated by 3–2 but at home AEK won easily by 5–1. In the final AEK met Panionios who came from two consecutive unexpected qualifications. In the game, while AEK managed to take the lead early on, Panionios succeeded in putting AEK to "sleep" and by not letting them impose their frenetic tempo, completed the comeback and won by 3–1 and became one of the biggest surprises in the history of the institution.

The end of the championship found AEK and Olympiacos, even in the first place with 56 points and a play-off match for the title was set. Olympiacos either in fear of a possible embarrassment from AEK, or as part of an unofficial deal with the HFF in exchange for silencing allegations of bribery and consequently avoiding demotion, were not going to show up to the match. The excuse was the protest for the refereeing of Charalampos Pamporidis against OFI in the last matchday, considering him responsible for not managing to complete the comeback of a 3–1 loss that would resulted in winning the league. On June 16, at the stadium on Leoforos Alexandras Stadium, AEK were the only team lined up on the pitch. The absence of Olympiacos automatically declared AEK champion with a 2–0 victory without a match. During the season AEK were an unstoppable football machine that dismantled their opponents as they achieved the league's best offense with a total of 90 goals, rewarding their opponents 6 times with 5 goals and 2 with 7 goals. Thomas Mavros was declared the top scorer of the league with 31 goals and 40 in total, winning the European Silver Shoe, just 3 goals behind Kees Kist. In the third place of the top scorers of the league was Dušan Bajević with 24 goals and in the 8th, Takis Nikoloudis with 12. That season would be the last at AEK for the emblematic leader, Mimis Papaioannou which after 17 consecutive years of presence, he would be passed on the pantheon of the legends in the history of the club.

Players

Squad information

NOTE: The players are the ones that have been announced by the AEK Athens' press release. No edits should be made unless a player arrival or exit is announced. Updated 30 June 1979, 23:59 UTC+3.

Transfers

In

Out

Loan out

Renewals

Overall transfer activity

Expenditure:  ₯0

Income:  ₯0

Net Total:  ₯0

Pre-season and friendlies

Alpha Ethniki

League table

Results summary

Results by Matchday

Fixtures

Championship play-off

Greek Cup

Matches

Quarter-finals

Semi-finals

Final

European Cup

First round

Second round

Statistics

Squad statistics

! colspan="11" style="background:#FFDE00; text-align:center" | Goalkeepers
|-

! colspan="11" style="background:#FFDE00; color:black; text-align:center;"| Defenders
|-

! colspan="11" style="background:#FFDE00; color:black; text-align:center;"| Midfielders
|-

! colspan="11" style="background:#FFDE00; color:black; text-align:center;"| Forwards
|-

|}

Disciplinary record

|-
! colspan="17" style="background:#FFDE00; text-align:center" | Goalkeepers

|-
! colspan="17" style="background:#FFDE00; color:black; text-align:center;"| Defenders

|-
! colspan="17" style="background:#FFDE00; color:black; text-align:center;"| Midfielders

|-
! colspan="17" style="background:#FFDE00; color:black; text-align:center;"| Forwards

|}

References

External links
AEK Athens F.C. Official Website

AEK Athens F.C. seasons
AEK Athens
1978–79